Steve Andrew Rucchin (born July 4, 1971) is a Canadian former professional ice hockey centre who played for three teams in the National Hockey League, most notably for the Mighty Ducks of Anaheim.

Playing career
Rucchin played high school hockey for Sir Frederick Banting Secondary School in London, Ontario.  His coach happened to also be an assistant with the University of Western Ontario and recruited him.  He was an Ontario University All-Star in three of his four seasons there, and was named Player of the Year and First-team All-Canadian in his senior season. He was drafted 2nd overall in the 1994 NHL Supplemental Draft by the Mighty Ducks of Anaheim.

He soon centered Anaheim's top line with Paul Kariya and Teemu Selänne, a major feat for a former CIS player. Though there are numerous former NCAA players in the NHL, Canadian Interuniversity Sport alumni are few and far between in the NHL, let alone a top line center. Rucchin was an alternate captain from 2000–2003, and captain in 2003–05. In the 2003 Stanley Cup Playoffs, Rucchin earned his spot in Mighty Ducks immortality when he helped the Ducks upset the Detroit Red Wings in a sweep of four games by scoring the game-winning and series-clinching overtime goal in Game 4. At the 1998 World Championship in Switzerland, he and his older brother Larry made history when they faced each other, with Steve playing for Canada, while Larry played for Italy.

In August 2005, he was traded to the New York Rangers for minor-league enforcer Trevor Gillies and a conditional 2007 draft pick in a move to dump salary. He ranks fifth in Ducks history in assists (279), goals (153), points (432), and game-winning goals (23).  Known as a great locker-room teammate, he provided veteran leadership in 2005–06, as an alternate captain (along with Jaromir Jagr and Darius Kasparaitis) on a young Rangers team.

On July 3, 2006, Rucchin signed as a free agent with the Atlanta Thrashers. In his 47th game with the Thrashers, on March 6, 2007, he suffered a concussion on a hit by Ben Guite of the Colorado Avalanche. He was ruled out for the remainder of the season with post-concussion syndrome. Prior to the 2007-08 season, Rucchin failed a physical at training camp and sat out the final year of his contract effectively ending his professional career.

Career statistics

Regular season and playoffs

International

Personal life
Rucchin currently resides in London, Ontario, and frequently travels to Anaheim, California.

References

External links

1971 births
Anaheim Ducks draft picks
Atlanta Thrashers players
Canadian ice hockey centres
Canadian people of Italian descent
Ice hockey people from Ontario
Sportspeople from Thunder Bay
Living people
Mighty Ducks of Anaheim players
National Hockey League supplemental draft picks
New York Rangers players
San Diego Gulls (IHL) players
Western Mustangs men's ice hockey players